Dusk was an identity used by several fictional superheroes appearing in American comic books published by Marvel Comics.

Fictional character biography

Negative Zone versions
During one of his adventures, Spider-Man travelled to the Negative Zone.  While there, he befriended a group of rebels battling the tyrannical Blastaar. Their leader had been a hero called Dusk who wore a completely black costume. Dusk's name and costume had in fact been taken up by a series of people as a symbol of freedom—but the latest man to take up Dusk's mantle had been killed by Blastarr's forces shortly after Spider-Man's arrival. At the rebels' request, Spider-Man wore the costume and led the rebels to victory. When he returned to the normal universe, he still had the costume.

Later, a new Dusk took up the name and costume in the Negative Zone.

Peter Parker

When Spider-Man was accused of murder during the Identity Crisis storyline, Peter Parker donned several different costumes to continue saving lives without anyone knowing it was him; one of the adopted identities was that of Dusk. As Dusk, Peter pretended to be a mercenary with a quiet and serious personality, and teamed up with the Trapster who had in fact framed him for murder under Norman Osborn's orders by using a duplicate of Spider-Man's webbing to kill the small-time crook Joey Z. After helping the Trapster escape an attack from the Shocker, Trapster and Dusk became regular allies, taking out some of Osborn's various criminal activities across the city. Although Dusk failed to record a confrontation between Trapster and Osborn where Osborn admitted a role in the murder, Dusk was able to convince Trapster that the best way to hurt Osborn now was to admit his role in framing Spider-Man for Joey Z's murder. When he cleared his name, Peter abandoned the costume.

Although the hero Black Marvel later gave a duplicate Dusk costume to Cassie St. Commons, the original remained in Peter's possession and has not been worn/seen since.

Cassie St. Commons

Cassie St. Commons first appeared in Slingers #0 (Dec 1998). Cassie was a college student at ESU with jet black hair, facial tattoos, and nose and tongue piercings. She was invited to join the Slingers, and was presented with the Dusk costume by the Black Marvel. She accepted, but had to undertake an "initiation" into the group by making a heroic leap across the rooftop of one building and land on another. While her teammates, Prodigy, Ricochet, and Hornet all had powers (or equipment) that enabled them to easily make the jump, she did not. When the others were distracted, Cassie did not actually jump, but instead purposefully fell to her death.

But Cassie was reborn, no longer dead, but not truly alive. She was Dusk. She found that she could teleport anywhere in a swirl of shadows, and she had some kind of psychic awareness that enabled her to feel her teammates. When she returned, her fellow Slingers were shocked to see their friend back from the dead. But being dead didn't stop Dusk from developing a crush on Ricochet, or having Hornet fall in love with her. But she kept both boys at a distance, since she felt that they couldn't know what it was like to be alive, yet not have a heartbeat. Dusk's powers began to evolve to the point where she could use her powers to transport other people, and manipulate shadows, and she proved herself to be an invaluable ally. Her talent to sense the location and well-being of her teammates saved Hornet, when she "knew" that he was captured by a killer rat-man. When she learned that Black Marvel had been taken by Mephisto, she was shocked. When she learned that her costume was given to Black Marvel by the demon, she was horrified. But Dusk used her control over the darkness to help her team free Black Marvel's soul from Mephisto when he was captured. The team disbanded, and Dusk left to discover what she truly was.

Dusk was next seen being held captive by the Puppet Master. Puppet Master used an improved version of his magic clay to capture various women, including female heroes and villains along with Stature, Araña, Tigra, and Silverclaw, and hold them in a state of suspended animation. He intended to sell the captives off as "interactive art". Dusk made no further appearances during the storyline, which concluded with Puppet Master's defeat and the release of his other captives. Her current whereabouts are again unknown.

Meanwhile, in the Loners series, it was shown that Mattie Franklin had been hired by Cassie's parents to find out if Ricochet knew the whereabouts of their daughter. During the scene that revealed this, a female shadow resembling Dusk was visible behind Mattie.

Following the "Secret Empire" storyline, Dusk returns after the apparent resurrection of the Hornet where she assists Ricochet and the Scarlet Spider in confronting the demonic monster summoned by the new Hornet, drawing the creature into herself and apparently destroying it. She joined the team in their plan to 'blackmail' the Scarlet Spider into surrendering himself to the authorities for his attack on Silas Thorne. She soon realizes that their apparently-resurrected mentor Black Marvel has no soul and that Hornet is actually Cyber who was resurrected by an as-yet-unidentified entity that was posing as Black Marvel. After the Black Marvel is defeated, Dusk asks to talk with the Scarlet Spider about Mysterio.

Powers and abilities
In addition to his regular abilities, the Dusk costume allowed Peter Parker to become virtually invisible in the shadows and glide short distances.

Cassie St. Commons has many supernatural abilities. Her primary power is the ability to teleport herself (or others) anywhere she wishes to be. She can manipulate shadows to form objects or constructs of solid dark energy, a power she used to great effectiveness during the battle against Mephisto's horde of demons. She also can regenerate damaged tissue and she has a clairvoyant ability to sense the whereabouts of her teammates, and know if they are in danger, no matter how far away she is from them. She claims that she is able to tell whether or not others have souls due to her own experience of being dead.

In other media

Video games
 Dusk appears as an unlockable costume in Spider-Man 2: Enter Electro.
 Dusk appears as a downloadable costume in Spider-Man: Edge of Time.
 Dusk appears as a playable character in Spider-Man Unlimited.

References

External links
 Dusk (1st Negative Zone version) at Marvel Wiki
 Dusk (2nd Negative Zone version) at Marvel Wiki
 Dusk (Cassie St. Commons at Marvel Wiki
 

Marvel Comics superheroes
Marvel Comics characters who can teleport
Marvel Comics characters with accelerated healing
Marvel Comics undead characters
Fictional characters with precognition
Comics characters introduced in 1998
Fictional characters who can manipulate darkness or shadows
Articles about multiple fictional characters